Kurahashiodes is a genus of true flies in the family Sarcophagidae.

Species
K. suenagai (Kurahashi, 1994)

References 

Sarcophagidae
Schizophora genera